"Noche de Sexo" is a song by Wisin & Yandel, featuring Romeo Santos of Aventura. The single reached number 17 on the Billboard Hot Latin Tracks Year-End Chart of 2006. This was the first collaboration between the two groups. The song was nominated for Hot Latin Songs of the Year by Vocal Duet or Collaboration at the 2007 Latin Billboard Music Awards losing to "La Tortura" by Shakira and Alejandro Sanz.

Charts

Weekly charts

Year-end charts

References

Aventura (band) songs
Wisin & Yandel songs
2006 singles
Songs written by Romeo Santos
Songs written by Wisin
Songs written by Yandel